The smallmouth buffalo (Ictiobus bubalus, from the Greek for "bull-fish" and "buffalo") is a catostomid fish species native to the major tributaries and surrounding waters of the Mississippi River in the United States, as well as some other water systems where it has been introduced. It is a long-lived, stocky fish like its relatives the bigmouth buffalo (I. cyprinellus) and the black buffalo (I. niger), although the smallmouth buffalo's mouth is located ventrally like other Catostomidae species, while the bigmouth buffalo's mouth is terminal and opens forward, and the smallmouth buffalo's eyes are significantly larger than those of the black buffalo. Despite being members of different scientific families, these three species superficially resemble the common carp (Cyprinus carpio), but an easy and notable difference is that all catostomids lack the characteristic barbels of carp.

Physical characteristics
The coloration of smallmouth buffalo ranges from shades of gray to brown and coppery green dorsally and pale yellow to white ventrally. Fin colors match the portion of the body where they attach and are generally darker towards the tips. They are characteristically stocky, having a hump that rises up from the operculum. Pectoral fins protrude ventrally like the anal fins, the caudal fin has even lobes, and the dorsal fin protrudes from the top of the hump to a blunt point, then shortens and runs the remaining length of the body to the base of the tail.

Habitat
The smallmouth buffalo is a hardy fish that frequents clear, moderate to fast-moving streams, but has been occasionally known in some lakes and ponds. If prefers waters with dense aquatic vegetation and a silty bottom. It has a high tolerance for hard water and can survive in waters with pH ranges of 6.5–8.5.

Diet
The smallmouth buffalo's diet is primarily that of a detritivore, using its ventral sucker mouth to pick up vegetation and other organic matter from the bottom of its habitat, often scraping algae off of rocks. It is also quite the invertivore, consuming zooplankton, insect larvae, mollusk larvae, and small crustaceans.

Life history
Spawning usually takes place in spring and summer, with more specific times depending on the location of the population. Migration is negligible. Spawning often occurs in shallower sections of streams where the egg can adhere to vegetation and gravel to keep from flowing away. Each female can lay tens of thousands to hundreds of thousands of eggs at a time depending on her size, and no parental care is applied and the eggs hatch in one to two weeks. The young hide in aquatic vegetation to avoid predators. The lifespan of a smallmouth buffalo is not well known because of limited study on their otoliths and a reliance instead on other structures (e.g. scales, fin rays, gill plates) that are inadequate for age analysis. However, a 2019 study took an initial look at their otoliths (earstones) from a commercially-harvested population in the middle Mississippi River drainage and found that even with harvest, about half of the sample was 20 years or older, with the oldest being 39 years of age. A 2020 study on a single female specimen from Oklahoma found she was 62 years old. The onset of sexual maturity for smallmouth buffalo varies by population but is typically 4–5 years for males and around 6 years for females.

Relationship with humans
Although historically and derogatorily considered by many to be a rough fish, smallmouth buffalo are native to North American ecosystems, are the most common commercially sold freshwater fish in the United States, are sought after by traditional anglers, and they are rapidly becoming a new sportfish as modernized night bowfishing has become increasingly popular since 2010 - a sport that targets this species among others. Thus, harvest management of this species (for sustainability) is in urgent need of reassessment as essentially no agency is tracking the ecological impact of modernized bowfishing, and there are virtually no limits on harvest. The species is highly valued by some as a human food source and the fish meal is common in animal feed. They are relatively quick and easy to raise in commercial farm ponds. Anglers seeking to hook a smallmouth buffalo have found success with doughballs and corn on hooks. 

An  fish taken from Athens Lake, Texas on May 6, 1993 by angler Randy Collins stands as the International Game Fish Association (IGFA) all-tackle world record for the species, while a
 specimen caught on May 16, 2022 in Livingston Lake, Texas by James Schmid is the current IGFA all-tackle length record.  The North Carolina state record for smallmouth buffalo is an  fish caught in Lake Wylie on November 14, 1993 by Tony Crawford, who had previously set the state record with a  fish caught at the same lake on December 1, 1991, both through use of packbait.  Smallmouth buffalo are not native to North Carolina, but it is not known when they were introduced there.

References

External links

Ictiobus
Fish described in 1818
Freshwater fish of the United States
Taxa named by Constantine Samuel Rafinesque